Julia Ditto Young (Ditto; December 4, 1857 – April 19, 1915) was an American poet and novelist.

Young's first literary effort dates back to her childhood days, and her first appearance in print was in local newspapers. She continued to write for Peterson's, and for several years wrote for Frank Leslie's publications. She was the author of a number of short stories, which were remarkable for the versatility of literary talent they displayed. Young also won flattering recognition with her poetry. In 1890, she published "Adrift, a Story of Niagara". A collection of verse, entitled Thistle Down, much of which had previously appeared in different journals of the country, was favorably received by press and public. Young died in 1915.

Early life and education
Julia Evelyn Ditto was born in Buffalo, New York, December 4, 1857. Her father, the late John A. Ditto, was a civil engineer, who twice served as city engineer of Buffalo. Her mother, Mrs. Margaret McKenna Ditto, became a successful painter in oils. Young was the niece of Margaret Emma Ditto, of Wellesley, Massachusetts, writer of humorous and original boys' stories.

She was educated in the grammar and in the State Normal School of Buffalo (now Buffalo State College).

Young's first literary efforts date back to her early childhood. Once, when she was about six years old, she complained to her mother with bitter weeping that her sister had purloined her chief treasure. "'Tis only a button tied to a string!" said the younger girl with scorn. "I don't care, it's my leading character, and my story can't go on without it!" was the reply. As soon as she had learned to write, she utilized her accomplishment to commit to paper a gloomy poem, "The Earl's Bride", as well as various verses and tales.

Career

After completing a thorough educational course, she married Robert D. Young, December 30, 1876. Mr. Young was a cashier of the Erie County Savings Bank. Two sons were born to them. The elder, Sydney, was born October 22, 1877, and died March 28, 1882; the younger was named Lawrence.

Her first appearance in print was in the Buffalo Evening Post, of September 13, 1871, the opening words of the story, "Shriek upon shriek rent the air, mingled with yells," being startling enough to attract the attention of editor and reader. Shortly afterwards, the Buffalo Express printed an article from her on Fort Erie, its jaunty inaccuracies calling forth from several villagers indignant responses. She continued to write for Peterson's, and for several years wrote a great deal for Frank Leslie's publications. Many of her works were short stories. Young also won praise with her poetry and made some translations of French and German poems into English verse. In November, 1889, she published a successful novel, Adrift: A Story of Niagara, the plot of which was laid in the neighborhood of Niagara Falls.

Personal life
Young made her home on Bouck Avenue, Buffalo. 

Julia Ditto Young died April 19, 1915, and was buried at Forest Lawn Cemetery.

Selected works
 Adrift : a story of Niagara, 1889
 Thistle Down: Poems, 1893
 This Then is the Story of Glynne's Wife Told in Numbers, 1896
 The story of Saville : told in numbers, 1897
 Black Evan. A tale of the "Forty-five". In verse. [With a portrait.], 1901
 Index and concordance to that cyclopedia of comment, the philistine magazine, Elbert Hubbard, editor : volumes I to XX, 1906?
 Barham Beach: A Poem of Regeneration, 1908
 Sonnet to Theodore Roosevelt on his departure for Africa, March, 1909., 1909
 Lines, 1915

References

Attribution

External links
 
 

1857 births
1915 deaths
19th-century American women writers
19th-century American poets
19th-century American novelists
20th-century American women writers
20th-century American poets
20th-century American novelists
Writers from Buffalo, New York
Buffalo State College alumni
American women poets
Novelists from New York (state)
Wikipedia articles incorporating text from A Woman of the Century